The Taipei Representative Office in the EU and Belgium represents interests of Republic of China (Taiwan) in Belgium, Luxembourg, as well as in the European Union institutions, in the absence of formal diplomatic relations, functioning as a de facto embassy.

It was established in 1976 as the Chambre de Commerce Sino-Belge. It was later renamed Far East Trading Services, Inc.

Since the closure of the Luxembourg City office in 2002, it has also been responsible for relations with Luxembourg. The Luxembourg office had been established in 1975 as the Centre Sun Yat-sen. 

The Office is headed by a Representative, currently  appointed October 2022, replacing Tsai Ming-yen appointed in June 2020.

Its counterparts in Taiwan are the European Economic and Trade Office, Belgian Office, and the Luxembourg Trade and Investment Office.

Representatives

  (1971–1990)
  (1991–1994)
 Huang Yen-chao (1995–2001)
 David Lee (2001–2004)
 Chen Chien-jen (2004–2006)
 Michael Kau (2006–2008)
 Shen Lyu-shun (2008–2009)
 David Lin (2010–2012)
 Tung Kuo-yu (2013–2017)
 Tseng Hou-jen (2017–2020)
 Tsai Ming-yen (2020–2022)
 (since 2022)

See also
 List of diplomatic missions of Taiwan
 List of diplomatic missions in Belgium

References

External links
 Taipei Representative Office in the EU and Belgium

Belgium
Diplomatic missions in Brussels
Taiwan–European Union relations
Belgium–Taiwan relations